Vishwar Shaw (born 4 May 1993) is a Surinamese cricketer. He played in the 2015 ICC World Cricket League Division Six tournament.

References

External links
 

1993 births
Living people
Sportspeople from Georgetown, Guyana
Surinamese cricketers